Mario Carafa (died 1576) was a Roman Catholic prelate who served as Archbishop of Naples (1565–1576).

Biography
On 26 October 1565, Mario Carafa was appointed during the papacy of Pope Pius IV as Archbishop of Naples.
On 10 February 1566, he was ordained bishop by Giovanni Michele Saraceni, Cardinal-Priest of Santa Maria in Trastevere, with Paolo Emilio Verallo, Bishop of Capaccio, and Berardo Bongiovanni, Bishop of Camerino, serving as co-consecrators. 
He served as Archbishop of Naples until his death on 11 September 1576.

References 

16th-century Italian Roman Catholic archbishops
Bishops appointed by Pope Pius IV
1576 deaths